Aromitalia–Basso Bikes–Vaiano is a professional Women's road bicycle racing team based in Italy.

History

2014

Riders in
Martina Biolo, Rasa Leleivytė and Allison Linnell will join the team for the 2015 season On October 31, Marta Bastianelli signed with the team. Ewelina Szybiak, Kataržina Sosna, Miriam Romei, Alessia Martini, Sérika Gulumá, Lija Laizāne and Jessica Parra signed extensions with the team.

Riders out
Sylwia Kapusta retired at the end of the season.

Team roster

Major wins
2010
GP Vallaton, Kataržina Sosna
Cham, Kataržina Sosna
Lancy, Valentina Scandolara
2011
GP Città di Cornaredo, Rasa Leleivytė
2015
Stage 1 Giro Toscana Int. Femminile – Memorial Michela Fanini, Marta Bastianelli
2016
Pan American ITT Championships, Sérika Gulumá
2018
Giro dell'Emilia Internazionale Donne Elite, Rasa Leleivytė
2019
Stage 4 Giro Rosa, Letizia Borghesi

National champions

2010
 Lithuania Time Trial, Kataržina Sosna
2011
 Lithuania Road Race, Rasa Leleivytė
2014
 Colombia Time Trial, Sérika Mitchell
2015
 Latvia Time Trial, Lija Laizāne
 Latvia Road Race, Lija Laizāne
2017
 South Africa Time Trial, Heidi Dalton
 Latvia Time Trial, Lija Laizāne
 Latvia Road Race, Lija Laizāne
 Lithuania Mountainbike (XC), Silvija Latožaitė
2018
 Latvia Time Trial, Lija Laizāne
 Latvia Road Race, Lija Laizāne
 Lithuania Road Race, Rasa Leleivytė
2021
 Lithuania Time Trial, Inga Čilvinaitė
 Lithuania Road Race, Inga Čilvinaitė
2022
 Lithuania Time Trial, Inga Češulienė

Previous squads

2016

2015

As of 10 March 2015. Ages as of 1 January 2015.

2014

Ages as of 1 January 2014.

2013

Ages as of 1 January 2013.

2012

Ages as of 1 January 2012.

2011

Ages as of 1 January 2011.

References

External links

Cycling teams based in Italy
UCI Women's Teams
Cycling teams established in 2010